The Allen House, also known as Allendale, is a historic house in Clarksville, Tennessee. It was built in the Antebellum era for the Allen family. It is listed on the National Register of Historic Places.

History
The land (then 1,475 acres) was acquired by Captain Abraham Allen, a veteran of the American Revolutionary War, in 1796. He built a loghouse circa 1800.

The current house was built by slaves for the Allen family in 1858. In the 1960s, descendant Mr Allen and his wife, née Elizabeth Farmer, raised Hereford cattle and grew tobacco on their 300 acres of land. Their daughter, Amelia, was a competitive equestrian. By the late 1970s, the property still belonged to the same family.

Architectural significance
The house was designed in the Federal architectural style. It has been listed on the National Register of Historic Places since October 3, 1978.

References

Houses on the National Register of Historic Places in Tennessee
National Register of Historic Places in Montgomery County, Tennessee
Federal architecture in Tennessee
Houses completed in 1858